Auricular ligament may refer to:

 Anterior auricular ligament
 Posterior auricular ligament
 Superior auricular ligament